Kamienica  is a village in Limanowa County, Lesser Poland Voivodeship, in southern Poland. It is the seat of the gmina (administrative district) called Gmina Kamienica.

The village has a population of 4,000.

Notable residents
 Czesław Kukuczka (1935–1974), one of only two known foreign nationals (non-German descent and non-German resident) casualty of the Berlin Wall.

References

Villages in Limanowa County